Rustam Alamovych Akhmedzade (born 25 December 2000) is a professional footballer who plays as a midfielder for Zira FK, on loan from Qarabağ in the Azerbaijan Premier League. Born in Ukraine, he represents the Azerbaijan national team.

Career 
Rustam Akhmedzade was born in Khmelnytskyi oblast, and at the age of 6 he moved to Kyiv. There he studied football at the FC Zirka Kyiv. After graduation, he moved to Oleksandriya, where he played in the U-19 team at the age of 16-17. And then he moved to Kolos in January 2018.

In February 2020 he signed a half-year on loan deal with the Ukrainian Second League Podillya Khmelnytskyi, and in July 2020, Akhmedzade signed a contract with FC Mynai.

Akhmedzade made his Ukrainian First League debut for Mynai in a 2–1 home victory against Metalurh Zaporizhya on 19 July 2020. He scored his first goal for Mynai in the Ukrainian First League match against Avanhard in a 2–0 away victory on 7 August 2020.

On 15 December 2021, Akhmedzade signed for Qarabağ on a contract until 30 June 2026.

International career
Akhmedzade was born in Khmelnytskyi oblast, Ukraine, to a father from Azerbaijan, and a Ukrainian mother. He was called up to the Azerbaijan national team in May 2021. He debuted with Azerbaijan in a 2–1 friendly win over Belarus on 2 June 2021.

Honours
Mynai
 Ukrainian First League: 2019–20

References

External links
 
 

2000 births
Living people
Citizens of Azerbaijan through descent
Azerbaijani footballers
Azerbaijan international footballers
Ukrainian footballers
Azerbaijani people of Ukrainian descent
Ukrainian people of Azerbaijani descent
Association football forwards
Ukrainian Premier League players
Ukrainian First League players
FC Kolos Kovalivka players
FC Podillya Khmelnytskyi players
FC Mynai players
Sportspeople from Khmelnytskyi Oblast